This is a list of alumni of the University of Karachi.

A
 Jamiluddin Aali – Urdu poet, critic, playwright, essayist, columnist, and scholar
 Manzoor Ahmad – philosopher
 Rukhsana Ahmad – writer, playwright, and translator
 Afaq Ahmed – leader of Mohajir Qaumi Movement Pakistan
 Israr Ahmed – Pakistan-based Muslim religious figure
 Riaz Ahsan – professor and former president of Sindh Professors and Lecturers Association
 Mohammed Ajeeb – former Lord Mayor of Bradford
 Munir Akram – former Pakistan ambassador to the United Nations
 Shakil Auj – Scholar of Islamic Studies and founder of Al-Tafseer Welfare Trust 
 Ahmed Ali – co-founder of Progressive Writers Movement & Association; novelist; short story writer; critic; translator; diplomat; scholar
 Sohail Aman – Chief of Air Staff of the Pakistan Air Force
 Zafar Ishaq Ansari – scholar of Islamic studies
 Moinuddin Aqeel – author, critic, linguist, scholar of Urdu literature and linguistics
 Shaukat Aziz – former Prime Minister of Pakistan; former Citibank executive officer

B
 Wali Khan Babar – GEO News journalist
 Sanam Baloch – television actress
 Ansar Burney – human rights and civil rights activist

D
 Noon Meem Danish – poet
 Joseph R. D'Cruz –  professor of strategic management at the University of Toronto's Rotman School of Management
 Quentin D'Silva – former chairman and chief executive, Shell Pakistan Limited

F
 Aslam Farrukhi – Urdu author, critic, poet, linguist, scholar and broadcaster
 Tarek Fateh – writer, novelist, columnist, author
 Farman Fatehpuri – author, researcher, critic, linguist and scholar of Urdu literature and linguistics

G
 Khalida Ghous – scholar of international relations and human rights; activist

H
 Husain Haqqani – Pakistan's ambassador to the United States
 Hussain Haroon – Pakistan's ambassador to the United Nations
 Abrar Hasan – lawyer and constitutional expert
 Masuma Hasan – first female Ph.D. and first female Federal Secretary of Pakistan
 Syed Munawar Hasan – Ameer, Jamaat-e-Islami Pakistan
 Nehal Hashmi – Senator, General secretary PML-N Sindh 
 Mehwish Hayat – model
 Zahida Hina – columnist, author, poet
 Abdul Rasheed Hussain – Maldivian politician and public figure
 Altaf Hussain – leader and founder of the Muttahida Qaumi Movement

I
 Ibn-e-Insha – Urdu poet humorist and travelogue writer

J
 Jameel Jalibi – linguist, critic, writer, researcher, educationist and scholar of Urdu literature
 Nasreen Jalil – Naib Nazima of Karachi; MQM leader
 Sana Javed - Actress and model, best known for blockbuster drama Khaani

K
 Abul Khair Kashfi – author, researcher, critic, linguist and scholar of Urdu literature and linguistics
 Hiroji Kataoka – scholar of Urdu in Japan; exchange student in the early 1970s
 Abdul Qadeer Khan – scientist and metallurgical engineer, widely regarded as the founder of the uranium program of the country's atomic bomb projects
 Makhdoom Ali Khan – former Attorney General of Pakistan
 Rana Muhammad Akram Khan – former chairman, Punjab Bar Council

L
 Anthony Theodore Lobo – Roman Catholic bishop

M
 Rehman Malik – senator, Minister of Interior, Government of Pakistan
 A. C. Matin -  microbiologist and immunologist
 Nisar Memon – former Federal Minister for Information and Broadcasting
 Ajmal Mian – former Chief Justice of Pakistan
 Haseena Moin – playwright, drama writer
 Gholam Mujtaba – politician and Pakistani American
 Waheed Murad – film actor

N
 Farooq Naek – Chairman of the Senate of Pakistan, ex-Law Minister
 Abdul Hameed Nayyar – physicist, peace activist
 Michael Nazir-Ali – Bishop of Rochester in the Church of England
 Asif Noorani – newspaper and television writer

P
 Zinia Pinto – principal of the elite St Joseph's Convent School (Karachi) from 1963 to 1999

Q
 Pirzada Qasim – scholar, Urdu poet and Vice Chancellor of the University of Karachi
 Muhammad Ahmed Qadri – Islamic Scholar and Political Scientist, founder of Islamic Educational and Cultural Research Center

R
 Raza Rabbani – senator
 Atta ur Rahman – chairman of HEC; director of H.E.J. Research Institute of Chemistry
 Raheel Raza – author
 Nisha Rao - lawyer and activist

S
 Arman Sabir – BBC and Dawn journalist
 Faisal Sabzwari – deputy parliamentary leader of MQM
 Nida Sameer – anchorperson of Geo News
 Syed Sajjad Ali Shah – former Chief Justice of Pakistan
 Rashid Minhas Shaheed – PAF Officer; received Nishan-e-Haider
 Parveen Shakir – Urdu poet, teacher, civil servant of the Government of Pakistan
 Bina Shaheen Siddiqui 
 Muhammad Ali Siddiqui – philosopher and critic
 Nazim Hussain Siddiqui – former Chief Justice of Pakistan
 Saeeduzzaman Siddiqui – former Chief Justice of Pakistan
 Shahid Aziz Siddiqi – former Federal Secretary, Vice Chancellor Ziauddin University
 Takeshi Suzuki – professor of Urdu in Japan, exchange student from 1960 to 1962

T
 Atif Tauqeer – journalist, poet, writer and vlogger

U
 Muhammad Taqi Usmani – Hanafi Islamic scholar; served as a judge on the Shariah Appellate Bench of the Supreme Court of Pakistan

W
 Fauzia Wahab – politician in the Pakistan Peoples Party
 Raees Warsi – poet; author; founder and president of Urdu Markaz New York

Z
 Muhammad Ziauddin - Pakistani journalist, economist and historian

References

Karachi
Karachi-related lists